Federal Motor Vehicle Safety Standard 108 (FMVSS 108) regulates all automotive lighting, signalling and reflective devices in the United States. Like all other Federal Motor Vehicle Safety Standards, FMVSS 108 is administered by the United States Department of Transportation's National Highway Traffic Safety Administration.

Usage outside of USA

Canada 
Canada's analogous regulation is called Canada Motor Vehicle Safety Standard 108 (CMVSS 108), and is very similar to FMVSS 108. The primary differences are: 
 CMVSS 108 requires daytime running lamps on all vehicles made since 1 January 1990, while FMVSS 108 permits but does not require DRLs
 CMVSS 108, through an adjunct called CMVSS 108.1, permits European headlamps, while FMVSS 108 prohibits them. 
Both standards differ markedly from the UN (formerly "European") standards used in most other countries worldwide, not only in technical provisions, terminology, and requirements, but in format: each European standard deals with only one type of lighting device, while the single U.S. and Canadian standards regulate all lighting and reflective devices.

New Zealand 

Retroreflective material fitted to a heavy motor vehicle in New Zealand manufactured on or after 1st Jan 2006 must comply with either UNECE Regulation 104 or FMVSS 108.

Certification 
It is the responsibility of a manufacturer of vehicles and/or vehicle lamps to certify that each motor vehicle and/or lamp is in full compliance with the minimum performance requirements of FMVSS 108. This is a self-certification process as opposed to the type approval process which is used in other lighting regulations such as UNECE Regulation 48.

In order to show compliance to FMVSS 108, the lens of each original equipment and replacement headlamp, daytime running lamp (DRL) and certain conspicuity reflectors must be marked with the symbol “DOT.” This symbol may also be applied to compliant signal lighting devices, but is not mandatory.

See also
Automotive lighting
Headlamp
World Forum for Harmonization of Vehicle Regulations
Motorcycle headlamp modulator
FMVSS

References

External links
FMVSS 108 full text
CMVSS 108 full text 
CMVSS 108.1 full text 
ECE regulations (see regulations 128, 123, 119, 113, 112, 104, 99, 98, 91, 87, 82, 77, 76, 74, 72, 70, 69, 65,  57, 56, 50, 48, 45, 38, 37, 31, 23, 20, 19, 8, 7, 6, 5, 4, 3, and 1)
 U.S. DOT Docket Viewer (Enter docket # 8885 to view U.S. DOT headlamp glare regulation proposal and comments thereto)

Automotive safety
Lighting
Motorcycle regulation
Automotive standards
Standards of the United States